The Atlantic District is one of the 35 districts of the Lutheran Church–Missouri Synod (LCMS), and covers eastern New York state: New York City, Long Island, the Hudson Valley, and the Capital District. It comprises approximately 100 congregations and a number of mission stations, subdivided into 10 circuits, as well as 22 preschools, 16 elementary schools and 6 high schools. Baptized membership in Atlantic District congregations is approximately 30,500. The rest of New York is included in the Eastern District; in addition, four congregations in the New York City area are in the non-geographic English District, and one congregation in Yonkers is in the SELC District.

The Atlantic District was separated in May 1906 from the Eastern District; portions of the district were split off into the New England District and the New Jersey District in 1972. District offices are located in New York, New York.  Delegates from each congregation meet in convention every three years to elect the district president, vice presidents, circuit counselors, a board of directors, and other officers. Derek Lecakes was elected as the district president in August 2022 at the 61st Regular Convention which was held on July 22-23, 2022 at Our Savior's Lutheran Church in Albany, NY.  Since then, he has been succeeded by Rev. Dien Ashley Taylor.

Concordia College (New York), which was part of the LCMS's Concordia University System, ceased offering classes as of August 2021, with a final conferral of degrees in December 2021. A district congregation, the Evangelical Lutheran Church of Saint Matthew, in Washington Heights, Manhattan, was founded in 1664 and is the oldest congregation in the Missouri Synod.

Presidents
Rev. Ernst C. L. Schulze, 1906–1918
Rev. Philip H. L. Birkner, 1918–1930
Rev. Arthur J. C. Brunn, 1930–1941
Rev. George K. A. Koenig, 1941–1942
Rev. Herman J. Rippe, 1942–1960
Rev. Karl F. Graesser, 1960–1967
Rev. Rudolph P. F. Ressmeyer, 1967–1976
Rev. Henry L. Koepchen, 1976 (acting president)
Rev. Ronald F. Fink, 1976–1989
Rev. James Zwernemann, 1989–1991
Rev. Dr. David H. Benke, 1991–2015
Rev. Derek Lecakes, 2015–2022
Rev. Dr. Dien Ashley Taylor, 2022-present

Ressmeyer was one of four district presidents who were removed from office by Synod President J. A. O. Preus on April 2, 1976, for non-compliance with synodical directives on the ordination and placement of improperly endorsed ministerial candidates from Seminex.

References

External links
Atlantic District web site
List of Atlantic District congregations
LCMS: Atlantic District
LCMS Congregation Directory

Lutheran Church–Missouri Synod districts
Lutheranism in New York (state)
Christian organizations established in 1906
Lutheran districts established in the 20th century
1906 establishments in New York (state)